The Howa Bowl was a first-class cricket competition in South Africa that ran from the 1972–73 to 1990–91 cricket seasons. Originally known as the Dadabhay Trophy, it was contested between Eastern Province, Natal, Transvaal and Western Province.

The Howa Bowl was run during South Africa's exclusion from international cricket due to apartheid, and was limited to non-white players, who were not permitted to compete in the Currie Cup. It was organised by the South African Cricket Board, with the matches being played over three days. The pitches used in the competition were poor quality, which is highlighted by the fact that a team passed 400 in an innings just six times, while falling for under 100 on 87 occasions.

In 1991, the fall of apartheid saw South Africa's sporting isolation ended and the formation of the United Cricket Board (UCB). Consequently, the racial divisions in the nation's domestic cricket were abolished after 102 years: with this, the raison d'etre for the Howa Bowl ceased to exist, and the competition was ended.

First-class status
Although the 216 Howa Bowl matches had not been given first-class status at the time the competition ended, the UCB subsequently requested that these be added retrospectively. In 2006, Wisden added these matches to the official records, along with seven other representative matches between non-white teams.

This decision meant that West Indian Test cricketer Rohan Kanhai, who had played in the competition's 1974/75 season with success, moved past Plum Warner on the list of all-time leading first-class run scorers, and also joined his former teammate Gary Sobers with 86 career centuries.

Further to this, two more instances of the rare dismissal  handled the ball were added to the records, along with the first-ever case of a batter being given out timed out: Andrew Jordaan, playing for Eastern Province v Transvaal at Port Elizabeth in 1987–88 – he had been not out overnight, but arrived late the next morning due to the roads being poor after torrential rain.

Champions by season

The Howa Bowl was dominated by Western Province, who won fourteen of the 19 titles outright (one was shared with Natal, which was Natal's only title), while Eastern Province won three and Transvaal won one.

Statistical leaders

References

South African domestic cricket competitions
Cricket and apartheid